The Cabinet of Namibia is an appointed body that was established by Chapter 6 (Articles 35-42) of the Constitution of Namibia. It is mandated to include the following positions: the President of Namibia, the Prime Minister of Namibia and any positions that the President so appoints.

All cabinet members also sit in the National Assembly. This situation has been criticised by Namibia's civil society and the opposition as creating a significant overlap between executive and legislature, undermining the separation of powers. Moreover, the seniority of cabinet members generally relegate ordinary MPs to the back benches.

List of cabinets of Namibia

Current cabinet (2020–)
The current cabinet was announced on 21 March 2020. Several deputy minister positions have been disestablished as a cost-cutting measure. The Ministry of Agriculture, Water and Forestry has been merged with the Ministry of Land Reform, and The Ministry of Veteran Affairs is now part of Defence.
President: Hage Geingob
Vice President: Nangolo Mbumba
Prime Minister: Saara Kuugongelwa-Amadhila
Deputy Prime Minister: Netumbo Nandi-Ndaitwah
Minister of Presidential Affairs: Christine ǁHoebes
 Deputy for the recognition of the disabled: Alexia Manombe-Ncube
 Deputy for the recognition of marginalised people: Royal ǀUiǀoǀoo
Minister of Agriculture, Water and Land Reform: Calle Schlettwein
Deputy: Anna Shiweda
Attorney General: Festus Mbandeka
Minister of Defence and Veterans Affairs: Peter Vilho (until April 2021), Frans Kapofi
Deputy: Hilma Nicanor
Minister of Education, Arts and Culture: Anna Nghipondoka
Deputy: Faustina Caley
Minister of Environment, Forestry and Tourism: Pohamba Shifeta
Deputy: Heather Sibungo (from April 2021)
Minister of Finance: Iipumbu Shiimi
Deputy: Maureen Hinda-Mbuende (from April 2021)
Minister of Fisheries and Marine Resources: Albert Kawana (until April 2021), Derek Klazen
Deputy: Sylvia Makgone
Minister of Gender Equality, Poverty Eradication and Social Welfare: Doreen Sioka
Deputy: Bernadette Jagger
Minister of Health and Social Services: Kalumbi Shangula
Deputy: Esther Muinjangue (NUDO), the only opposition politician in cabinet
Minister of Home Affairs, Immigration, Safety and Security: Frans Kapofi (until April 2021), Albert Kawana
Deputy: Daniel Kashikola
Minister of Higher Education, Training and Innovation: Itah Kandjii-Murangi
Deputy: Veno Kauaria (from April 2021)
Minister of Industrialization and Trade: Lucia Iipumbu
Deputy: Verna Sinimbo
Minister of Information and Communications Technology: Peya Mushelenga
Deputy: Emma Theofelus
Minister of International Relations and Cooperation: Netumbo Nandi-Ndaitwah
Deputy: Jennely Matundu
Minister of Justice: Yvonne Dausab
Minister of Labour, Industrial Relations and Employment Creation: Utoni Nujoma
Deputy: Hafeni Ndemula
Minister of Mines and Energy: Tom Alweendo
Deputy: Kornelia Shilunga
Director General of the National Planning Commission: Obeth Kandjoze
Minister of Public Enterprises: Leon Jooste
Minister of Sport, Youth and National Service: Agnes Tjongarero
Deputy: Emma Kantema-Gaomas
Minister of Urban and Rural Development: Erastus Uutoni
Deputy: Derek Klazen (until April 2021), Natalia ǀGoagoses
Minister of Works and Transport: John Mutorwa
Deputy: Veikko Nekundi

2015–2020
The 6th Cabinet was announced on 19 March 2015. The position of Vice-President was established for the first time, as well as five ministries with two deputy ministers each. Their double appointments significantly increased the number of top positions in public administration.

A major cabinet reshuffle occurred in February 2018 when two ministers were fired, the vice president retired on health grounds, and several other rotations took place. In the wake of the February cabinet reshuffle the number of deputy ministers was reduced again to one per ministry, with the Office of the Vice-President the only exception. This move was announced as a cost-cutting measure.

 President: Hage Geingob
 Vice President: Nickey Iyambo (until February 2018), Nangolo Mbumba
 Prime Minister: Saara Kuugongelwa-Amadhila
 Deputy Prime Minister and Minister of Foreign Affairs: Netumbo Nandi-Ndaitwah
 Deputy: Peya Mushelenga (until February 2018), Christine ǁHoebes
 Deputy: Maureen Hinda-Mbuende (until February 2018)
 Attorney-General: Albert Kawana
 Director General of the National Planning Commission and Minister of Economic Planning: Tom Alweendo (until February 2018), Obeth Kandjoze
 Deputy: Lucia Iipumbu (until February 2018), Piet van der Walt
 Minister of Agriculture, Water and Forestry: John Mutorwa (until February 2018), Alpheus ǃNaruseb 
 Deputy: Theo Diergaardt
 Deputy: Anna Shiweda
 Minister of Defence: Penda ya Ndakolo
 Deputy: Billy Mwaningange
 Minister of Education, Arts and Culture: Katrina Hanse-Himarwa (until July 2019), Martin Andjaba (acting)
 Deputy: Anna Nghipondoka
 Minister of Environment and Tourism: Pohamba Shifeta
 Deputy: Tommy Nambahu (until February 2018), Bernadette Jagger
 Minister of Finance: Calle Schlettwein
 Deputy: Natangwe Ithete
 Minister of Fisheries and Marine Resources: Bernhard Esau (until 13 November 2019), Albert Kawana (acting)
 Deputy: Chief Samuel Ankama (until February 2018), Sylvia Makgone
 Minister of Gender Equality and Child Welfare: Doreen Sioka
 Deputy: Lucia Witbooi
 Minister of Health and Social Services: Bernard Haufiku (until December 2018), Kalumbi Shangula 
 Deputy: Juliet Kavetuna
 Minister of Higher Education, Training and Innovation: Itah Kandjii-Murangi
 Deputy: Becky Ndoze-Ojo
 Minister of Home Affairs and Immigration: Pendukeni Iivula-Ithana (until February 2018), Frans Kapofi
 Deputy: Erastus Uutoni
 Minister of Industrialisation, Trade and SME Development: Immanuel Ngatjizeko (until February 2018), Tjekero Tweya
 Deputy: Piet van der Walt (until February 2018), Lucia Iipumbu
 Minister of Information and Communication Technology: Tjekero Tweya (until February 2018), Stanley Simataa
 Deputy: Stanley Simaata (until February 2018), Engel Nawatiseb
 Minister of Justice: Albert Kawana (until February 2018), Sackeus Shanghala (until 13 November 2019), Frans Kapofi (acting)
 Deputy: Lidwina Shapwa
 Minister of Labour, Industrial Relations and Employment Creation: Erkki Nghimtina
 Deputy: Alpheus Muheua (until February 2018), Tommy Nambahu
 Minister of Land Reform: Utoni Nujoma
 Deputy: Bernadus Swartbooi (until December 2016), Priscilla Boois (from  December 2016) 
 Minister of Mines and Energy: Obeth Kandjoze (until February 2018), Tom Alweendo
 Deputy: Kornelia Shilunga
 Minister of Poverty Eradication and Social Welfare: Bishop Zephania Kameeta
 Deputy: Priscilla Beukes
 Deputy: Reverend Aino Kapewangolo
 Minister of Presidential Affairs: Frans Kapofi (until February 2018), Immanuel Ngatjizeko (until February 2018), Martin Andjaba
 Deputy: Christine ǁHoebes (until February 2018)
 Minister of Public Enterprises: Leon Jooste
 Deputy: Engel Nawatiseb (until February 2018), Veikko Nekundi
 Minister of Safety and Security: Charles Namoloh
 Deputy: Daniel Kashikolo
 Minister of Sport, Youth and National Service: Jerry Ekandjo  (until February 2018), Erastus Uutoni
 Deputy: Agnes Tjongarero
 Minister of Urban and Rural Development: Sophia Shaningwa (until February 2018), Peya Mushelenga
 Deputy: Derek Klazen
 Deputy: Sylvia Makgone (until February 2018), Chief Samuel Ankama
 Minister of Veterans' Affairs: Nickey Iyambo
 Deputy for the recognition of the disabled: Alexia Manombe-Ncube
 Deputy for the recognition of marginalised people: Royal ǀUiǀoǀoo
 Deputy for the recognition of veterans of the fight for independence: Hilma Nicanor
 Minister of Works and Transport: Alpheus ǃNaruseb (until February 2018), John Mutorwa
 Deputy: Sankwasa James Sankwasa
 Deputy: Kilus Nguvauva

2010–2015
This Cabinet was appointed in 2010. The SWAPO congress end of November 2012 resulted in "one of the biggest Cabinet reshuffles the country has seen since independence".
 President: Hifikepunye Pohamba
 Prime Minister: Nahas Angula (2010-2012), Hage Geingob (2012-2015)
 Deputy Prime Minister: Marco Hausiku
 Speaker of Parliament: Theo-Ben Gurirab
 Deputy Speaker: Loide Kasingo
 Minister of Trade and Industry: Hage Geingob (2010-2012), Calle Schlettwein (2012-2015)
 Deputy: Tjekero Tweya
 Minister of Justice: Pendukeni Iivula-Ithana (2010-2012), Utoni Nujoma (2012-2015)
 Deputy: Tommy Nambahu
 Minister of Safety and Security: Nangolo Mbumba (2010-2012), Immanuel Ngatjizeko (2012-2015)
 Deputy: Erastus Uutoni
 Minister of Presidential Affairs and Attorney General: Albert Kawana
 Deputy: none
 Minister of Defence: Charles Namoloh (2010-2012), Nahas Angula (2012-2015)
 Deputy: Lempy Lucas (2010-2012), Petrus Iilonga (2012-2015)
 Minister of Home Affairs and Immigration: Rosalia Nghidinwa (2010-2012), Pendukeni Iivula-Ithana (2012-2015)
 Deputy: Elia Kaiyamo
 Minister of Finance: Saara Kuugongelwa-Amadhila
 Deputy: Calle Schlettwein (2010-2012), vacant as from 4 December 2012
 Minister of Regional and Local Government, Housing and Rural Development: Jerry Ekandjo (2010-2012), Charles Namoloh (2012-2015)
 Deputy: Priscilla Beukes
 Minister of Foreign Affairs: Utoni Nujoma (2010-2012), Netumbo Nandi-Ndaitwah (2012-)
 Deputy: Peya Mushelenga
 Minister of Health: Richard Kamwi
 Deputy: Petrina Haingura
 Minister of Education : Abraham Iyambo (until 2 February 2013), David Namwandi (from 21 February 2013)
 Deputy: David Namwandi (until 20 February 2013), Silvia Makgone (from 21 February 2013)
 Minister of Lands and Resettlement: Alpheus ǃNaruseb
 Deputy: Theo Diergaardt (appointed January 2011)
 Minister of Works and Transport: Erkki Nghimtina
 Deputy: Chief Samuel Ankama (2010-2012), Chief Kilus Nguvauva (2012-2015)
 Minister of Agriculture, Water and Forestry: John Mutorwa
 Deputy: Petrus Iilonga (2010-2012), Lempy Lucas (2012-)
 Minister of Environment and Tourism: Netumbo Nandi-Ndaitwah (2010-2012), Uahekua Herunga (2012-2015)
 Deputy: Uahekua Herunga (2010-2012), Pohamba Shifeta (2012-)
 Minister of Labour and Social Welfare: Immanuel Ngatjizeko (2010-2012), Doreen Sioka (2012-2015)
 Deputy: Alpheus Muheua
 Minister of Veterans' Affairs: Nickey Iyambo
 Deputy: Hilma Nicanor (appointed in January 2011)
 Minister of Gender Equality and Child Welfare: Doreen Sioka (2010-2012), Rosalia Nghidinwa (2012-2015)
 Deputy: Angelika Muharukua
 Minister of Information and Information Technology: Joel Kaapanda
 Deputy: Stanley Simataa
 Minister of Fisheries and Marine Resources: Bernard Esau
 Deputy: Chief Kilus Nguvauva (2010-2012), Chief Samuel Ankama (2012-2015)
 Minister of Mines and Energy: Isak Katali
 Deputy: Willem Isaacks
 Minister of Youth, National Service, Sport and Culture: Kazenambo Kazenambo (2010-2012), Jerry Ekandjo (2012-2015)
 Deputy: Pohamba Shifeta (2010-2012), Juliet Kavetuna (2012-2015)
 Auditor General: Junias Kandjeke

2005–2010
Below is a list of the cabinet of the Republic of Namibia from appointment in 2005 until replacement in 2010:

 President: Hifikepunye Pohamba
 Prime Minister: Nahas Angula
 Deputy Prime Minister and Minister of Foreign Affairs: Marco Hausiku
 Minister of Defense: Major General Charles Ndaxu Namoloh
 Minister of Veterans Affairs: Ngarikutuke Tjiriange
 Minister of Education: Nangolo Mbumba
 Deputy: Rebecca Ndjoze-Ojo
 Minister of Finance: Saara Kuugongelwa-Amadhila
 Minister of Safety and Security: Nickey Iyambo
 Minister of Trade and Industry: Immanuel Ngatjizeko (2005-2008), Hage Geingob (2008-2010)
 Deputy: Bernhardt Esau
 Minister of Home Affairs and Immigration: Rosalia Nghidinwa
 Minister of Information and Broadcasting: Joel Kaapanda
 Deputy: Raphael Dinyando
 Minister of Justice: Pendukeni Iivula-Ithana
 Minister of Mines and Energy: Erkki Nghimtina
 Minister of Labour and Social Welfare: Immanuel Ngatjizeko
 Deputy: Petrus Iilonga
 Minister of Health and Social Service: Richard Kamwi
 Minister of Agriculture, Water, and Forestry: John Mutorwa
 Minister of Fisheries and Marine Resources: Abraham Iyambo
 Minister of Environment and Tourism: Willem Konjore (until 2008) Netumbo Nandi-Ndaitwah
 Minister of Lands and Resettlement: Alpheus ǃNaruseb
 Minister of Local and Regional Government, Housing and Rural Development: Jerry Ekandjo
 Deputy: Kazenambo Kazenambo
 Minister of Works, Transport and Communication: Helmut Angula
 Deputy: Paulus Kapia until October 2005, then Steve Mogotsi
 Minister of Gender Equality and Child Welfare: Marlene Mungunda
 Deputy: Angelika Muharukua
 Minister of Youth, National Service, Sport, and Culture: Willem Konjore (since 2008)
 Deputy: Pohamba Shifeta
 Minister of Presidential Affairs: Albert Kawana
 National Planning Commission Director: Peter Katjavivi
 Namibia Central Intelligence Service Director: Lukas Hangula

2000–2005
The third cabinet of Sam Nujoma was announced on Independence Day 2000.

1995–2000
The second cabinet under Sam Nujoma was announced on Independence Day 1995. In 1999 a re-shuffle took place, mainly affecting deputy ministers.

 President: Sam Nujoma
 Prime Minister: Hage Geingob
 Minister of Mines and Energy: Andimba Toivo ya Toivo (until 1999), Jesaya Nyamu
 Deputy: Jesaya Nyamu (until 1999), Klaus Dierks

1990–1995
The first cabinet after Namibian independence consisted of 19 ministers appointed by inaugural president Sam Nujoma. In 1991, two further ministries were established:
 President: Sam Nujoma
 Prime Minister: Hage Geingob
 Attorney-general: Hartmut Ruppel
 Director-general of the National Planning Commission: Zedakia Ngavirue
 Minister of Agriculture: Gert Hanekom (until 1992), Anton von Wietersheim (until 1993), Nangolo Mbumba
 Minister of Defence: Peter Mweshihange
 Minister of Education: Nahas Angula
 Minister of Environment: Niko Bessinger
 Minister of Finance: Otto Herrigel (until 1992), Gert Hanekom
 Minister of Fisheries (established 1991): Helmut Angula
 Minister of Foreign Affairs: Theo-Ben Gurirab
 Minister of Health: Nickey Iyambo
 Minister of Home Affairs: Hifikepunye Pohamba
 Minister of Information: Hidipo Hamutenya (until 1993), Ben Amathila
 Minister of Justice: Ngarikutuke Tjiriange
 Minister of Labour: Hendrik Witbooi
 Minister of Lands: Marco Hausiku
 Minister of Local Government: Libertina Amathila
 Minister of Mines and Energy: Andimba Toivo ya Toivo
 Minister of Trade: Ben Amathila (until 1993), Hidipo Hamutenya
 Minister of Works: Richard Kabajani
 Minister of Youth (established 1991): Pendukeni Ivula-Ithana

References

Notes

Literature
 

Government of Namibia
Lists of political office-holders in Namibia
Namibia